The Freshies are an English punk rock band, formed in Manchester, England in 1978. The band was founded by singer-songwriter and comedian Chris Sievey, whose best-known creation – comedy character Frank Sidebottom – originated as a mascot for the group.

Over a four-year period between their formation and break-up in 1982, the Freshies released several singles, as well as three studio albums. 

Since Sievey's death in 2010, the Freshies reformed for sporadic appearances at tribute events to their founder; these occasionally included his son Harry Sievey on lead vocals and guitar, until his passing in 2017.

Original members Barry Spencer and Rick Sarko reformed the band permanently in 2019, following the release of the documentary Being Frank: The Chris Sievey Story. This lineup of the Freshies includes Paul Taylor (guitar) and Chris Connolly (drums). In 2020, the band announced plans to release their first new material since 1982.

Career
Chris Sievey had recorded since the early 1970s, and released two cassettes under his own name before starting the Bees Knees in 1972 with bass guitarist Paul Burke which they renamed the Freshies in 1974. According to Sievey, when the band were looking for a guitarist, a fourteen-year-old Johnny Marr appeared at his house wanting to join the band but was told that he was too young. The Freshies EP was released in 1978 on Sievey's own Razz record label, and was followed later that year by the hopefully titled Straight In at No. 2 EP. Others who played with Sievey included, in the early lineup, Martin Jackson (later with Magazine and Swing Out Sister) and Billy Duffy (later with the Cult). In 1978, the band included Barry Spencer (guitar), Eddie Carter (guitar), and Bob Dixon (drums).  By 1979, the band was Sievey, Spencer, Rick Sarko (bass, ex-the Nosebleeds) and Mike Doherty (drums, ex-the Smirks). Others who played in the band include Lyn Oakey (guitar), Steve Hopkins (keyboards), Paul Whittall(keyboards), Paul Burgess (drums), and Rick Maunder (bass).

The band's biggest selling single and best known song is 1980's "I'm in Love with the Girl on the Manchester Virgin Megastore Check-out Desk" renamed as "I'm in Love with the Girl on a Certain Manchester Megastore Check-out Desk" on request from Radio 1 (a version with "Virgin" bleeped out to allow it to be played on the radio without being considered advertising was also released), which reached number 54 on the UK Singles Chart in February 1981 after being picked up by MCA, eventually selling over 40,000 copies. At the time, the girl who was the subject of the song was frequently asked by fans to autograph copies of the single. The single's success prompted Richard Branson to undertake a search for the former checkout girl in question in 2006, wishing to invite her to the opening of the new Virgin Megastore in Manchester, in recognition of the role she played in the history of the original store.

Sievey pre-dated the self-financing ethic of punk when he created his own record label Razz in 1974. Razz went on to release over sixty titles, including much of the Freshies material.  They also produced the first multi-media single by including The Biz, a Sinclair Spectrum game, on the tape version of one of their singles, something which Sievey later did himself as a solo artist with his 45 RPM single "Camouflage" (which included the Spectrum game Flying Train).

The Freshies split up in February 1982. Sievey continued with the Freshies name for a while, working as a duo with Barbara O'Donovan, and released the "Fasten Your Seatbelts" single (as the Freshies) in September 1982 and "Camouflage" (under his own name) in 1983. Sievey later found fame as Frank Sidebottom.

Sievey died on 21 June 2010 in Hale, Greater Manchester, at the age of 54.  He had been suffering from cancer.

Discography

Albums

Compilations

EPs

Singles

VHS
Razzvizz 2 (1981), Razz

Lineup 
On the Freshies' first release, 1977's All Sleep's Secrets, Sievey was the only credited artist. The earliest known line up of the band beyond just Sievey also consists of Barry Spencer on vocals and guitar, Paul Whittle on keyboards, Richard Maunder on bass, and Bob Dixon on drums. This is the lineup featured on the 1978 promo cassette Manchester Plays. The 1979 Banana Island album credits a similar line-up, minus Paul Whittle who is replaced by Sievey on keyboards. In 1980, Bob Dixon was replaced by Neil Tomkinson on drums for the "Yellow Spot" and "My Tape's Gone" singles, before himself being replaced by Mike Doherty for the Rough N Ready mini-album. Also replaced for the mini-album was Richard Maunder on bass guitar, who was replaced with Rick Sarko. This line up would play on two 1981 singles; "Dancin' Doctors" and "If You Really Love Me, Buy Me a Shirt", before breaking up. In 1982, Sievey would release a single with Barbara O'Donovan under the name the Freshies, titled "Fasten Your Seatbelts". In 1984, he released an untitled solo EP as the Freshies, and in 1985 would release The Johnny Radar Story, as the Freshies.

References

External links
 Biography
 Chris Sievey and The Freshies

English punk rock groups
English new wave musical groups
Musical groups from Manchester
MCA Records artists
Stiff Records artists